Burrum was a Legislative Assembly electorate in the state of Queensland, Australia.

History
Burrum was created by the Electoral Districts Act of 1887, taking effect at the 1888 elections. It was based on the rural area around Maryborough, Queensland.

Burrum was abolished at the 1932 elections, its area being incorporated into the Electoral district of Isis and Electoral district of Wide Bay.

Members

The following people were elected in the seat of Burrum:

Election results

See also
 Electoral districts of Queensland
 Members of the Queensland Legislative Assembly by year
 :Category:Members of the Queensland Legislative Assembly by name

References

Former electoral districts of Queensland
1888 establishments in Australia
1932 disestablishments in Australia
Constituencies established in 1888
Constituencies disestablished in 1932